There are 1,774 firm orders for all versions of the Airbus A330; 1,486 for the A330ceo (current engine option) and a further 288 for the A330neo (new engine option), of which a total of 1,468 A330ceo and 94 A330neos have been delivered as of end of February 2023.

History
On 12 March 1987, Airbus received the first orders for the twinjet. The domestic French airline Air Inter (then Air France Europe) placed five firm orders and 15 options while Thai Airways International requested eight aircraft, split evenly between firm orders and options. The following day, Airbus announced that it planned to formally launch the A330/A340 programme by mid-April 1987, and was on track to deliver the first A340 by May 1992 and the A330 the following year. On 31 March, Northwest Airlines followed Air Inter and Thai by signing a letter of intent for 20 A340s and 10 A330s.

Air Inter became the first operator of the A330 after accepting delivery on 30 December 1993 and placing the aircraft into service on 17 January 1994 between Orly Airport and Marseille. Deliveries to Malaysia Airlines (MAS) and Thai Airways International were postponed due to delamination of the composite materials in the engine thrust reverser assembly. Thai Airways received its first A330 during the second half of the year, operating it on routes to Taipei and Seoul from Bangkok on 19 December 1994. MAS received its A330 on 1 February 1995 then rescheduled deliveries of the 10 other aircraft on order. Cathay Pacific received Trent 700s in late March 1995, days after MAS following the certification of the engine on 22 December 1994.

Orders and deliveries
The following is a list of orders, deliveries and backlog for the Airbus A330 by model as of 28 February 2023:
 Ord — number of aircraft ordered from Airbus by the specified customer
 Del — number of aircraft delivered by Airbus to the specified customer
 Bl — number of aircraft still to be delivered to the specified customer

 Updated: 28 February 2023.

See also

 List of Airbus A330 operators

References

A330 orders
330